This is a list of shipwrecks in the Indian Ocean.

Arabian Sea

Bay of Bengal

Central Indian Ocean

Christmas Island

Cocos (Keeling) Islands

Great Australian Bight

Mozambique Channel

Persian Gulf

Red Sea

Strait of Malacca

References

Indian Ocean
Indian Ocean